3-O-Methylfunicone is a chemical compound isolated from Penicillium pinophilum. It inhibits the growth of phytopathogenic fungi.

References 

4-Pyrones
Phenol ethers
Penicillium